The Hillend Loch Railway Path, also known as the Airdrie to Bathgate Railway Path, is a rail trail located in central Scotland.

It formed part of National Cycle Route 75 which runs from Clyde to Forth.
It is also known as Airdrie to Bathgate Railway Path.

The railway reopened in 2010 and the path was relocated to run alongside the railway line.

See also
 Bathgate and Coatbridge Railway
 Airdrie–Bathgate rail link
 Bathgate
 National Cycle Network
 List of rail trails

References

Sources and further reading

 
 Sustrans
 Photographs of path
 

Rail trails in Scotland
Footpaths in North Lanarkshire
Protected areas of West Lothian
Airdrie, North Lanarkshire
Bathgate